The Hunter Saw & Machine Company is a historic former industrial property in the Lawrenceville neighborhood of Pittsburgh, Pennsylvania. It is located at Butler Street and 57th Street, just outside the Lawrenceville Historic District. The property is a complex of four buildings dating to between 1907 and approximately 1945 which served as the headquarters and manufacturing facility of the Hunter Saw & Machine Company, which produced various custom tools and machinery with a specialty in cold saws. The company was founded in 1898 by Henry S. Hunter, Joseph Kennedy, and Emil Anschuetz, and remained in business until 1969 when it was bought out by a competitor, ASKO. The Lawrenceville plant continued to operate until 1988. As of 2021, the buildings have been renovated as office, commercial, and residential space.

The complex consists of four buildings. The easternmost building at the corner of Butler and 57th is Machine Shop A, which is the original section of the plant built in 1907. It is a two-story building, seven bays wide by six bays deep, with a front-gabled monitor roof. The building is of heavy timber-frame construction with a brick exterior and has a c. 1910 steel-framed shed addition at the rear. To the west is a small two-story, two-bay brick office building which was built around 1915. A restroom structure behind the office collapsed and was converted into a small courtyard. On the other side of the office is Machine Shop B, which was built around 1920. It is a one-story, four-bay brick building with a sawtooth roof. Further west is a c. 1945 storage and shipping building which is of steel-frame and concrete construction.

References

Industrial buildings and structures on the National Register of Historic Places in Pennsylvania
Industrial buildings completed in 1907
Industrial buildings and structures in Pittsburgh
National Register of Historic Places in Pittsburgh
1907 establishments in Pennsylvania
Defunct manufacturing companies based in Pittsburgh